NGC 2775 (also known as Caldwell 48) is a spiral galaxy in the northern constellation of Cancer, located at a distance of  from the Milky Way. It was discovered by William Herschel in 1783. NGC 2775 belongs to the Antlia-Hydra Cluster of galaxies and is the most prominent member of a small galaxy group known as NGC 2775 group, part of the Virgo Supercluster, along with the Local Group. Other members of the NGC 2775 group include NGC 2777 and UGC 4781.

This object has a morphological classification of SA(r)ab, which indicates an unbarred spiral galaxy (SA) with a prominent ring structure (r) and flocculent, tightly wound spiral arms (ab). The galaxy is inclined by an angle of 44° to the line of sight from the Earth. An explanation for the latter could be a high supernova rate. Although star formation is taking place in the dusty outer ring, NGC 2775 does not display any current starburst activity, and the galactic nucleus is virtually free of any star formation whatsoever.

The galaxy's hydrogen tail feature indicates a past interaction with a faint companion. A satellite galaxy appears to have orbited NGC 2775 multiple times, losing mass as it does so and creating faint, shell-like structures. Nearby irregular galaxy NGC 2777 displays a tidal tail of hydrogen gas that points back to NGC 2775, suggesting the two may be linked.

SN1993z is the only supernova known to have occurred in NGC 2775. It was detected on September 23, 1993, at a magnitude of 13.9, and was classified as a Type Ia supernova. By September 25, spectral analysis showed that it had peaked four weeks earlier.

Gallery

References

External links

 NGC 2775 at Deepskypedia

Unbarred spiral galaxies
Flocculent spiral galaxies
Cancer (constellation)
2775
04820
25861
048b
Astronomical objects discovered in 1783